Persiaran Senawang 1 (English: Senawang Boulevard 1), designated as  Malaysia Federal Route 242, is a dual-carriageway federal road in Seremban, Negeri Sembilan, Malaysia. Linking Paroi and Senawang, this dual-carriageway serves as the bypass of the Seremban city centre to Kuala Pilah and vice versa. This dual-carriageway may also provide a direct link between the North–South Expressway Southern Route and the Kajang–Seremban Highway. The Kilometre Zero of the Federal Route 242 is at Paroi.

Construction at Paroi Interchange
The project was built as a replacement of the former signalised four-way intersection between Persiaran Senawang 1 (Federal Route 242) Federal Route 51  and Kajang–Seremban Highway E21. Construction began in 2012 and was scheduled to be completed in 2014.

LEKAS-NSE Link
PLUS Malaysia Berhad (PMB), the operator of the North South Expressway (NSE), has proposed to build a toll road in Senawang, Negeri Sembilan, linking the Kajang–Seremban Highway (Lekas) E21 to the North–South Expressway Southern Route E2.

Features
At most sections, the Federal Route 242 was built under the JKR U4 road standard, allowing maximum speed limit of up to 70  km/h.

List of interchanges, intersections and towns

References

Malaysian Federal Roads
Highways in Malaysia